Jalan Teluk Sengat (Johor state route J222) is a major road in Johor, Malaysia. It is a main route to Kota Johor Lama.

List of junctions

References

Roads in Johor